Parapapá is a song by Spanish singer Melody from her upcoming album. It was recorded in Miami, produced by Rafa Vergara, and released by Sony Music on June 28, 2018.

Background and release
The song was written by Melody Ruíz, Vicky Echeverrí, Juanfran Parra, Elliot Justo, Junior De La Rosa, and Rafa Vergara, the latter who also produced the song. The song is a fusion of Latin and tropical rhythms in Castilian. It was released on June 28, 2018 along with its accompanying music video. The video surpassed one million views on YouTube after just a few days of its release.

Music video
The video for Parapapá was released on the same day as the song. The video, like the song, was well received and described as sexy.

Charts

Weekly charts

Year-end charts

References 

2018 singles
Sony Music Latin singles
Spanish-language songs
2018 songs
Melody (Spanish singer) songs